Serooskerke is the name of two villages in Zeeland, Netherlands:

 Serooskerke, Schouwen-Duiveland
 Serooskerke, Walcheren